Brad Cox is an Australian country singer-songwriter from Jindabyne, New South Wales.

Early life
Brad Cox was born in 1995 as the son of two swimming coaches. Brad was drawn to the songs he heard on the car stereo during many weekend road-trips to swimming tournaments on the NSW south coast. Brad said "There was always four cassette tapes in the car, being Joe Cocker, Shania Twain, The Commitments soundtrack and something else. So yeah, I just started singing along in the car."

Brad's commenced piano lessons when he was in primary school. Brad said he "...started playing drums in a high school band and then playing cover gigs at a pub when I was 14 years old." Brad started listening to and writing country music at age 15. Brad said he is influenced by artists who "challenge country music" and the inspiration for his writing coming from personal experiences or from those around him.

Career

2017–2018: Debut EP
In January 2018, Cox won the Toyota Star Maker at the Country Music Awards of Australia during the Tamworth Country Music Festival

In May 2018, Cox released his self-titled, debut studio album. The album was proceeded by the singles "Too Drunk to Drive" and "Lake House". At the 2019 CMAA Awards, Cox was nominated for Contemporary Album of the Year and New Talent of the Year.

2019–2021: My Mind's Projection
In August 2019, Cox signed with Sony Music Australia. On signing Cox, said: "I've worked so hard on my career over many years from the ground up, and for me it's extremely humbling to know that Sony Music also has the same belief in my music that I do. I'm really excited to be working closely with Denis and the team to take this to the next level locally and internationally."

In November 2020, Cox released My Mind's Projection, which featured the singles "Short Lived Love", "Give Me Tonight", "Drinking Season" and the Adam Eckersley collaboration "Remedy". Cox described the album "as a snapshot the last three years of his life.". The album debuted at number 12 on the ARIA Charts.

In May 2021, Cox released the EP What's Your Favourite Country Song?.

2022: Acres
On 11 November 2022, Cox announced the forthcoming release of his third studio album, Acres, scheduled for release on 5 May 2023.

Discography

Albums

Extended plays

Awards

APRA Awards
The APRA Awards are held in Australia and New Zealand by the Australasian Performing Right Association to recognise songwriting skills, sales and airplay performance by its members annually.

! 
|-
| 2021
| "Give Me Tonight"
| Most Performed Country Song
| 
| 
|-
| 2022
| "Short Lived Love"
| Most Performed Country Song
| 
| 
|-

ARIA Music Awards
The ARIA Music Awards is an annual ceremony presented by Australian Recording Industry Association (ARIA), which recognise excellence, innovation, and achievement across all genres of the music of Australia. They commenced in 1987.

! 
|-
| 2021|| My Mind's Projection || ARIA Award for Best Country Album || 
| 
|-

Country Music Awards (CMAA)
The Country Music Awards of Australia (CMAA) (also known as the Golden Guitar Awards) is an annual awards night held in January during the Tamworth Country Music Festival, celebrating recording excellence in the Australian country music industry. They have been held annually since 1973.

! 
|-
| 2018 || himself || Toyota Star Maker||  || 
|-
| 2019
| Brad Cox
| Contemporary Country Album of the Year
| 
| 
|-
|rowspan="2"| 2020 ||"Rusty Strings" (with Jackson Besley) || Song of the Year || ||rowspan="2"| 
|-
| "Rusty Strings" (with Jackson Besley) || Single of the Year  || 
|-
|rowspan="3"| 2021 || "Remedy" (with Adam Eckersley) || Vocal Collaboration of the Year  || ||rowspan="3"| 
|-
| "Give Me Tonight"
| Song of the Year
| 
|-
| "Give Me Tonight"
| Single of the Year
| 
|-
|rowspan="2"| 2022 || || || ||rowspan="2"| 
|-
|
|
| 
|-

References

 

1995 births
21st-century Australian singers
21st-century Australian male singers
Australian country singers
Living people